Roman Kuzior (born 13 February 1949) is a Polish former sports shooter. He competed in the 50 metre running target event at the 1972 Summer Olympics.

References

1949 births
Living people
Polish male sport shooters
Olympic shooters of Poland
Shooters at the 1972 Summer Olympics
People from Lubliniec County
Sportspeople from Silesian Voivodeship
20th-century Polish people